Gustav Brühl (born 31 May 1826 in Herdorf, Prussia; died 16 February 1903 in Cincinnati) was an American physician, poet and archaeologist.

Biography
He studied at the colleges of Siegen, Münstereifel, and Treves, and graduated from the last named. He then studied medicine, history and philosophy at Munich, Halle, and Berlin. In 1848 he emigrated to Cincinnati, Ohio. He was physician of St. Mary's Hospital, lecturer on laryngoscopy in Miami Medical College.

He was one of the founders and first president of the Peter Claver Society for the education of black children. In 1874 he was one of the examiners of public schools in Cincinnati. In 1871 was nominated by the Democrats for state treasurer.

He pursued archaeological and ethnological studies.  This work took him to Mexico and Central and South America.

Writings
He published Poesien des Urwalds (1871), and wrote much for periodicals, both in prose and in verse. From 1869 until 1871, he edited Der Deutsche Pionier ("The German Pioneer").

Family
He was married to Margarete Reis.  They had three children.

Notes

References
 

1826 births
1903 deaths
American otolaryngologists
American medical writers
American male poets
American editors
American archaeologists
19th-century American poets
Prussian emigrants to the United States
19th-century American male writers
American male non-fiction writers